Xantusia gilberti, the Baja California night lizard, is a species of lizard in the family Xantusiidae. It is a small lizard found in the southern Baja California Peninsula of Mexico.

References

Xantusia
Endemic reptiles of Mexico
Endemic fauna of the Baja California Peninsula
Reptiles described in 1895
Taxa named by John Van Denburgh